The Danian is the oldest age or lowest stage of the Paleocene Epoch or Series, of the Paleogene Period or System, and of the Cenozoic Era or Erathem. The beginning of the Danian (and the end of the preceding Maastrichtian) is at the Cretaceous–Paleogene extinction event . The age ended , being followed by the Selandian.

Stratigraphic definitions
 
The Danian was introduced in scientific literature by German-Swiss geologist Pierre Jean Édouard Desor in 1847 following a study of fossils found in France and Denmark. He identified this stage in deposits from Faxe and Møns Klint and named it after the Latin name for Denmark. The Montian Stage from Belgian stratigraphy (named after the city of Mons) is now known to be roughly equivalent to the Upper Danian and is considered a junior synonym and is no longer in use.

The base of the Danian is defined at the iridium anomaly which characterized the Cretaceous–Paleogene boundary (K–T boundary) in stratigraphic sections worldwide. A section in El Kef, Tunisia was appointed as a reference profile (GSSP) for this important boundary. The Danian is the oldest age of the Paleocene, defined at its base by the K-Pg boundary. It is very important because the readily recognized iridium anomaly and primitive Danian planktonic foraminifers define the base of the Danian. Danian foraminiferans repopulated the Paleocene seas after the Cretaceous mass extinction (Olsson et al., 1996).  The first replacement foraminiferan of the Paleogene is the Globigerina eugubina, which is used to define the base of the Danian Age (Stainforth et al., 1975). This foraminiferan replaced the Cretaceous genus Globotruncana.

The top of the Danian Stage (the base of the Selandian) is close to the boundary between biozones NP4 and NP5 from marine biostratigraphy. It is slightly after the first appearances of many new species of the calcareous nanoplankton genus Fasciculithus (F. ulii, F. billii, F. janii, F. involutus, F. tympaniformis and F. pileatus) and close to the first appearance of calcareous nanoplankton species Neochiastozygus perfectus.

The Danian Stage overlaps the Puercan and Torrejonian North American land mammal ages and the Shanghuan and lowest part of the Nongshanian Asian land mammal ages. It includes the oldest Mammal Paleogene zones, all included in the 1 - 5 group.

Paleontology
Though the non-avian dinosaurs were gone, the mammals and other land animals remained small, most not even bigger than a sheep; however; a few (like Ankalagon saurognathus) reached the size of a medium-sized bear. Numerous lineages of modern birds also survived, particularly in the area around Australia but also elsewhere, e.g. Scaniornis of the North Sea region. The oceans remained much the same as the Late Cretaceous seas, only that there was less life, few remaining marine reptiles (mostly turtles, choristodera and crocodiles), and other lesser-known animals.

There are controversial reports of ammonites (mainly of the Scaphitidae class in Turkmenistan) still being around at this time, although they did not survive the Danian age.

Latest Danian Event
Close to the end of the Danian, around 62.2 Ma, occurred a hyperthermal, similar to but smaller in magnitude compared to the more famous Palaeocene-Eocene Thermal Maximum (PETM), known as the Latest Danian Event (LDE). The event, which took place over a 170-230 kyr time interval, is evidenced in the geologic record by two negative carbon isotope excursions and is believed to have led to a 2–3 °C warming of both deep and surface seawater. This hyperthermal also led to a shallowing of the oceanic lysocline, as evidenced by the significant decrease in calcium carbonate preservation.

References

Literature

; 1847: Sur le terrain Danien, nouvel étage de la craie, Bulletin de la Société Géologique de France, série 2, 3, pp. 179–181, . 
; 2004: A Geologic Time Scale 2004, Cambridge University Press.
; 2006: The Global Boundary Stratotype Section and Point for the base of the Danian Stage (Paleocene, Paleogene, "Tertiary", Cenozoic) at El Kef, Tunisia: original definition and revision, Episodes 29(4), pp. 263–273, .
; 1996:The Cretaceous-Tertiary catastrophe event at Millers Ferry, Alabama in Ryder, G., Fastovsky, D., and Gartner, S., eds., The Cretaceous-Tertiary Event and other catastrophes in Earth history: Geological Society of America Special Paper 307, pp. 263–277.
; 1975: Cenozoic planktonic foraminifera zonation and characteristics of index forms: The University of Kansas Paleontological Institute, Article 62, 425 p.

External links
GeoWhen Database – Danian 
Paleogene timescale (2008), at the website of the subcommission for stratigraphic information of the ICS
Stratigraphic chart of the Paleogene (2006), at the website of Norges Network of offshore records of geology and stratigraphy

 
Paleocene geochronology
 
Geological ages